Psittacofulvin pigments, sometimes called psittacins are responsible for the bright-red, orange, and yellow colours specific to parrots. In parrots, psittacofulvins are synthesized by a polyketide synthase enzyme that is expressed in growing feathers.  They consist of linear polyenes terminated by an aldehyde group. Colourful feathers with high levels of psittacofulvin resist feather-degrading Bacillus licheniformis better than white ones.

Both carotenoids and psittacofulvins have narrow-band absorbance spectra, reflecting pale yellow or red pigmentary colours, making them difficult to distinguish between using spectral measurements. However, there are differences between them when researched spectroscopically. The carotenoid and psittacofulvin yellows are very similar, but the red parrot pigment offers an advantage: it creates a more deep-red color when compared to astaxanthin, the pigment's counterpart in most other birds.

Birds have tetrachromatic vision, which means that they have four types of cone cells with peak sensitivities to longwave (l), mediumwave (m), shortwave (s), and ultraviolet (uv) or violet (v) light as well as transparent oil droplets made of carotenoid filters (with mainly the pigments galloxanthin, zeaxanthin, and astaxanthin) that refine spectral sensitivities of the l, m, and s cone-types. These filters in front of the photoreceptors tune their spectral sensitivity to longer wavelengths. Birds have yet another spectral filter allowing them to absorb wavelengths in the far UV wavelength range. 

Psittacofulvins in parrots and carotenoids in passerines have nearly the same range of colors, but neither pigment is found in the immediate common ancestor of these two groups. Parrots even have a concentration of carotenoids in their blood. This implies that both groups convergently evolved red, orange, and yellow pigmentation and that parrots did not evolve psittacofulvin to avoid the use of carotenoids.

References 

Biological pigments
Parrots
Polyenes